This is the discography of British producer Mura Masa.

Studio albums

Extended plays
 Someday Somewhere (2015)

Mixtapes
 Soundtrack to a Death (2014)

Singles

As lead artist

As a featured artist

Other charted songs

Songwriting and production credits

Remixes

Notes

References

Discographies of British artists